Raichur (formerly Raichore) is a city and municipality in the district of Raichur in the Indian state of Karnataka. Raichur, located between Krishna and Tungabhadra rivers, is the headquarters of Raichur district. It is located 409 km from the state capital, Bangalore.

History

The recorded history of the district is traced as far back as the third century B.C.E. The fact that three minor rock edicts of Ashoka are found in district one at Maski in the Lingasugur taluk and the other two near Koppal, which proves that this area was included in the dominions of the great Mauryan king Ashoka (273 - 236 B.C.E). At that time, this region was under the governance of the Viceroy or Mahamatra of Ashoka. Thereafter, the district appears to have been a part of the kingdom of the Satavahanas. The Vakatakas, who reigned during the 3rd and 4th centuries CE, seems to have held sway over Raichur for some time, after which it appears to have been included in the Kadamba dominions. The next dynasty of importance, which ruled over this region, was that of the Chalukyas of Badami. According to an inscription from Aihole, Pulakeshin II having defeated the Pallavas, occupied this area and made it a province in his empire under the governance of his son Adityavarma. Later the whole of the present Raichur district was included in the dominions of the Rashtrakutas, who rose to power in the eighth century, as could be gathered from the inscriptions of that period found in this district. According to an inscription from Manvi taluk, Jagattunga, a subordinate ruler under the Rashtrakuta king Krishna-II, was ruling the province of Adedore Eradusavirapranta, i.e., the area constituting the present Raichur district. Amoghavarsha Nrupathunga I, a Rashtrakuta king, has described Koppal in his Kannada work, Kavirajamarga, as the great Kopananagara.

Raichur has a rich history, having been a part of various empires, such as the Bahmanis Sultanate, Vijayanagara, the Adil Shahi dynasty of Bijapur and nizam of hyderabad. The city is famous for its imposing Raichur Fort. Here, stone inscriptions have been found in Persian, Urdu, and Arabic which belonged to the bastion of the fort, referring to its construction in 1294.  Among the ruins of the immense fort are many irrigation tanks and old temples. The fort was built by Kakatiya king Rudra in 1284 CE which passed on to the Vijayanagar kingdom after the decline of the Kakatiyas. Thereafter the fort was under dispute for nearly two centuries. It was captured by the Bahmanis in 1323 CE. Saluva Narasimha Deva Raya expressed a wish in his testament that the city of Raichur be recaptured. This had been in the mind of Krishnadevaraya since his coronation in 1509. In the year 1520 Krishnadevaraya sent Saeed Maraikar, a Muslim in his service, to Goa with a large sum of money to buy horses. Maraikar instead went to Adil Khan with the money and offered his services. Krishnadevaraya made a demand that Maraikar be returned along with the money which was duly refused. During the period of peace, Krishnadevaraya made extensive preparations for a grand attack on Raichur doab. After the court decided that Raichur should be attacked the king invited all commanders (Nayakas) in his service to take part in the battle.

Raichur is very rich from the epigraphical point of view. It has already yielded hundreds of inscriptions, ranging from the Mauryan period up to the end of the Muslim period. The inscriptions are in a variety of languages such as Sanskrit, Prakrit, Kannada, Telugu, Arabic, and Persian and belonging to almost all the dynasties that ruled over the Deccan. The most important places from this point of view are Maski, Koppal, Kuknur, Hatti Gold Mines, Mudgal, Lingsugur and Raichur.

The District of Raichur was a part of the Hyderabad State until the re-organisation of State on 1 November 1956.

Geography
It has an average elevation of 407 metres (1335 ft)

The summers get really hot in this region with temperatures going beyond 40 °C. It receives rainfall during the months between May to August. Overall, the region is warm and humid during most part of the year.

Demographics
As of the 2001 India census,

Hinduism is majority religion in Raichur with 57.61% followers. Islam is second most popular religion in Raichur with approximately 39.87% following it. In Raichur, Christianity is followed by 1.18%, Jainism by 0.94%, Sikhism by 0.08% and Buddhism by 0.08%. Around 0.00% stated 'Other Religion', approximately 0.29% stated 'No Particular Religion'. The official language is Kannada, but Urdu and Telugu are also spoken in small numbers.

Climate

See also
 Raichur Airport

References

External links

 Raichur City Official Website
 Weather in Raichur
 Zilla Panchayat of Raichur
 

 
Cities and towns in Raichur district
Cities in Karnataka
Taluks of Karnataka